Raoul bin Suhaimi (born 18 September 2005) is a Singaporean professional footballer who plays as a defender for Singapore Premier League club Young Lions.

Career statistics

Club

Notes

International statistics

U19 International caps

U16 International caps

References

2005 births
Living people
Singaporean footballers
Association football defenders
Singapore Premier League players
Young Lions FC players